Lin En-yu, (born 25 March 1981), is a former Taiwanese professional baseball pitcher. After serving in Chinese Taipei's National Training Team in 2003 and 2004,  he was drafted by the Macoto Cobras of the Chinese Professional Baseball League in Republic of China in early 2005 and stayed with the team until the end of 2006. He later played for Tohoku Rakuten Golden Eagles of the Nippon Professional Baseball in Japan since 2007, under the introduction of former Cobras manager Kuo Tai-yuan and followed his teammate Lin Ying-Chieh. Lin throws a variety of different pitches and has a fastball speed up to 151 km/h (94 mph), and has been a frequent member of the Chinese Taipei national baseball team since 2003.

Records

Achievements 
In his first 2005 CPBL season Lin won the following awards:  rookie of the year, best nine players on the field, and the annual most valuable player.
Lin pitched the first historical ball in World Baseball Classic history on March 3, 2006, at the Tokyo Dome (Chinese Taipei vs. South Korea).
In the 2006 CPBL season, Lin set the record of achieving most strike outs in a single season in the CPBL history (209K in 202.2 innings), as well as led in wins and earned run average.

See also 
Chinese Taipei national baseball team

External links 

1981 births
Living people
2006 World Baseball Classic players
Baseball players at the 2004 Summer Olympics
Olympic baseball players of Taiwan
Taiwanese expatriate baseball players in Japan
Tohoku Rakuten Golden Eagles players
Macoto Cobras players
Brother Elephants players
Baseball players from Tainan